Martin Sexton  Born March 2, 1966 is an American singer-songwriter and music producer.

Early life 
Born in 1966, Sexton grew up in Syracuse, New York, the tenth of twelve children in a working class Irish-American family. He acquired his first guitar, a Sears & Roebuck acoustic model, at age 14.

Career 
In 1988, Sexton moved to Boston, and began playing on street corners and at open mic nights around the city. Sexton released a collection of self-produced demo recordings in 1991 called In The Journey. The album was released on an 8-track cassette, and Sexton sold 15,000 copies to fans.

He was given the National Academy of Songwriters Artist of the Year Award in 1994.  He released Black Sheep in 1996, an album called The American in 1998, and another album called Wonder Bar in 2000. He launched his independent record label, Kitchen Table Records, in 2001 and released a concert album called Live Wide Open. His album, Seeds, was released in 2007.

In 2008, he released a second live album called Solo. Subsequent albums included Sugarcoating (2010), Fall Like Rain (2012). and Mixtape of the Open Road (2015).

In 2017, Martin joined Chris Anderson (upright and electric bass) and Boo Reiners (multi-string instruments) to make The Martin Sexton Trio.

Sexton's latest recording, "2020 Vision" was released on September 1, 2021.

Discography

Albums
In the Journey (Koch Entertainment, 1992)
Black Sheep (Koch International, 1996)
The American (Atlantic Records, 1998)
Live at the Fillmore (Atlantic Records, 1999)
Wonder Bar (Atlantic Records, 2000)
Live Wide Open (Kitchen Table, 2001)
Live at Newbury Comics (Kitchen Table, 2003)
Camp Holiday (Kitchen Table, 2005)
Seeds (Kitchen Table, 2007)
Solo (Kitchen Table, 2008)
Sugarcoating (Kitchen Table, 2010)
Mixtape of the Open Road (Kitchen Table, 2015)
Live at the Belly Up (2017) – download only

Extended plays
Fall Like Rain (Kitchen Table, 2012)
2020 Vision (Kitchen Table, 2021)

Charted singles

Other contributions
Live & Direct – Volume 1, WYEP-FM, Pittsburgh, Pennsylvania, (1999) – "The American"
Live & Direct – Volume 3, WYEP-FM, Pittsburgh, Pennsylvania, (2001) – "Where Did I Go Wrong"
Live at the World Café - Volume 9 (1999) – "The American"

References

External links 

 Official site
 Audio recording of an NPR Interview
 2012 Interview with American Songwriter

Living people
1966 births
American folk guitarists
American male guitarists
American folk musicians
Fingerstyle guitarists
Musicians from Syracuse, New York
Independent Music Awards winners
American street performers
Singer-songwriters from New York (state)
Guitarists from New York (state)
20th-century American guitarists
20th-century American male musicians
American male singer-songwriters